Karl Thomas was an American sailor.

Karl Thomas may also refer to:

Karl Thomas (cricketer)
Karl Thomas, Prince of Löwenstein-Wertheim-Rosenberg
Karl O. Thomas, American vice-admiral who serves as the commander of the United States Seventh Fleet

See also

Carl Thomas (disambiguation)